Shumei can refer to any of the following:

Shinji Shumeikai (神慈秀明会) - a New Religious movement started in Japan in 1970.
Church of World Messianity - a Japanese New Religion related to Shinji Shumeikai
Shūmei (襲名) - a name succession ceremony in kabuki